The list of shipwrecks in January 1923 includes ships sunk, foundered, grounded, or otherwise lost during January 1923.

3 January

4 January

5 January

6 January

12 January

15 January

16 January

17 January

19 January

20 January

21 January

22 January

24 January

26 January

29 January

30 January

31 January

References

1923-01
 
01
January 1923 events